719 Naval Air Squadron (719 NAS) was a Naval Air Squadron of the Royal Navy's Fleet Air Arm. It initially formed in 1944 as a Fighter Air Firing Training Squadron, at RNAS St Merryn, within the School of Air Combat. At the start of 1945 the squadron disbanded into 794 NAS. The squadron reformed in 1946 at RNAS Fearn as a Strike Training Squadron, before moving to RNAS Eglinton, where it became an Anti-submarine Training Squadron, disbanding there in 1949.

The squadron reformed at Eglinton as the Naval Air Anti-submarine School in 1950 and remained there becoming the Naval Anti-Submarine Operational Flying School and eventually disbanding in 1959. However, in 1960, the squadron reformed, again at Eglinton, as the Joint Anti-submarine School Flight, this time operating helicopters. The squadron was granted first line status on the 5 October 1961 and renumbered to 819 Naval Air Squadron.

History of 719 NAS

Fighter Air Firing Training Squadron (1944 - 1945) 

It was equipped with a variety of Fleet Air Arm aircraft including, Corsair III, Master II, Seafire Ib & IIc, Spitfire Vb and Wildcat IV.

The squadron provided weapon training and air firing exercises as part of a Naval Air Firing course, however, six months after forming, on the 2 January 1945, the squadron disbanded into 794 NAS at St Merryn.

Strike Training Squadron / Anti-submarine Training Squadron (1946 - 1949) 

It was initially equipped solely with Barracuda, a British carrier-borne torpedo and dive bomber aircraft.

The squadron started to be equipped with Firefly FR.1, the "fighter/reconnaissance" variant, of the carrier-borne fighter aircraft and anti-submarine aircraft. However, from the 24 to the 31 October 1946, the squadron operated from the aircraft carrier and lead ship of her class, HMS Implacable (R86), using its Barracuda III aircraft. 719 NAS became an Anti-submarine Training Squadron, where it bought together aircrew, trained them and passed onto 744 NAS for more advanced training and it continued in this role until the 27 December 1949, when it disbanded at Eglinton.

Naval Air Anti-submarine School (1950 - 1959) 

719 Naval Air Squadron reformed at RNAS Eglinton, on the 14 June 1950, as the Naval Air Anti-submarine School. Along with 737 NAS, the squadron formed the 53rd Training Air Group. 719 NAS was initially equipped with Firefly AS.5 aircraft and in then in 1951, it received Firefly AS.6 aircraft. Whilst the 53rd Training Air Group disbanded on 31 January 1952, the squadrons remained operational at Eglinton.

In March 1953 Firefly T.7 aircraft were received and the AS.5 and AS.6 were withdrawn throughout the following three months. During 1955 the squadron started operating the anti-submarine variant Gannet AS.1, carrier-borne aircraft, which were followed later by T.2 and these eventually replaced the Firefly aircraft. In 1957, 737 NAS disbanded but was absorbed into 719 NAS and the squadron became titled the Naval Anti-Submarine Operational Flying School. The squadron disbanded at Eglinton on the 17 March 1959.

Joint Anti-Submarine School Flight (1960 - 1961) 

719 Naval Air Squadron reformed on the 17 May 1960, at RNAS Eglinton, as the Joint Anti-submarine School Flight. It was equipped with three Whirlwind HAS.7 helicopters. From the 4 to the 14 October 1960, it operated it's Whirlwind helicopters off the Centaur-class aircraft carrier, HMS Hermes (R12) during its deployment in the North Sea. 719 NAS was granted first line status on the 5 October 1961 and renumbered to 819 Naval Air Squadron.

Aircraft operated
The squadron operated a variety of different aircraft and versions:
 Vought Corsair III
 Miles Master II
 Supermarine Seafire IIb & IIc
 Supermarine Spitfire Vb & Vb/hooked
 Grumman Martlet IV
 Fairey Barracuda III
 North American Harvard IIb
 Avro Anson I
 Fairey Firefly FR.1, AS.5, AS.6 & T.7
 Fairey Gannet AS.1 & T.2
 Westland Whirlwind HAS.7

Naval Air Stations and Aircraft Carriers  

719 Naval Air Squadron operated from a number of naval air stations of the Royal Navy, in the UK and two Royal Navy aircraft carriers
Royal Naval Air Station ST MERRYN (15 June 1944 - 2 January 1945)
Royal Naval Air Station FEARN (1 March 1946 - 14 May 1946)
Royal Naval Air Station EGLINTON (14 May 1946 - 24 October 1946)
HMS Implacable (R86) (24 October 1946 - 31 October 1946)
Royal Naval Air Station EGLINTON (31 October 1946 - 27 December 1949)
Royal Naval Air Station EGLINTON (14 June 1950 - 17 March 1959)
Royal Naval Air Station EGLINTON (17 May 1960 - 4 October 1960)
HMS Hermes (R12) (4 October 1960 - 14 October 1960)
Royal Naval Air Station EGLINTON (14 October 1960 - 5 October 1961) (became 819 Naval Air Squadron)

Commanding Officers 

List of commanding officers of 719 Naval Air Squadron with month and year of appointment and end:

1944 - 1955
Lt-Cdr J. L. Appleby, RN (Jun 1944-Jan 1945)

1946 - 1949
Lt-Cdr J. F. Arnold, RN (Mar 1946-Aug 1946)
Lt-Cdr (A) C. R. K. Coxon, RN (Aug 1946-Nov 1946)
Lt (A) J. M. Brown, RN (Nov 1946-Jan 1947)
Lt-Cdr F. G. B. Sheffield, DSC, RN (Jan 1947-Dec 1947)
Lt-Cdr (A) R. H. W. Blake, RN (Dec 1947-Dec 1949)

1950 - 1959
Lt-Cdr S. S. Laurie, RN	(Jun 1950-Sep 1950)
Lt-Cdr D. A. Berrill, RN (Sep 1950-Apr 1952)
Lt-Cdr R. H. W. Blake, RN (Apr 1952-Dec 1953)
Lt-Cdr J. D. Nunn, RN (Dec 1953-Jan 1956)
Lt-Cdr E. R. A. Johnson, RN (Jan 1956-Aug 1957)
Lt-Cdr A. W. Sabey, DSM, RN (Aug 1957-Dec 1957)
Lt-Cdr D. L. G. James, RN (Dec 1957-Jan 1959)
Lt-Cdr A. A. Reid, RN (Jan 1959-Mar 1959)

1960 - 1961
Lt-Cdr J. R. T. Bluett, RN (May 1960-Oct 1961)

References

Citations

Bibliography

700 series Fleet Air Arm squadrons
Military units and formations established in 1944
Military units and formations of the Royal Navy in World War II